Anbu Karangal is a 1965 Indian Tamil-language drama film, directed by K. Shankar and written by Balamurugan. The film stars Sivaji Ganesan, Devika, Manimala and K. Balaji. It was released on 19 February 1965.

Plot

Cast 
Sivaji Ganesan as Sivaraman
Devika as Annam
K. Balaji as Kannan
Manimala as Anandhi
V. K. Ramasamy as Soodamani
Nagesh as Thirupathy
Manorama as Ponnamma
O. A. K. Thevar
P. D. Sambandam as Saint
Seethalakshmi as Gunavathi
G. Sakunthala as Uma
Lakshmi Prabha as Lakshmi
S. D. Subbulakshmi as Nallama
Baby Shakeela as Kanmani

Soundtrack 
The music was composed by R. Sudarsanam, with lyrics by Vaali.

Release and reception 
Anbu Karangal was released on 19 February 1965. The Indian Express wrote, "While writer Balamurugan goes on stressing the obvious, director Sankar fills the film with silly symbolisms, meaningless montages and maddening melodrama. The cumulative effect is so pernicious that even the inimitable Sivaji is unable to save the movie."

References

External links 
 

1960s Tamil-language films
1965 films
Films directed by K. Shankar
Films scored by R. Sudarsanam
Indian drama films